Ricardo Rivera (born 8 April 1961) is an Argentine former professional tennis player.

Rivera, who goes by the nickname "Caio", represented Argentina at the 1978 Southern Cross Games (now South American Games) and won two medals in doubles.

While competing on the professional tour he reached a career high singles ranking of 236 in the world and made his only Grand Prix main draw appearance at the Buenos Aires tournament in 1982.

From 1994 to 1995 he served as captain of the Argentina Davis Cup team.

References

External links
 
 

1961 births
Living people
Argentine male tennis players
Argentine tennis coaches
Competitors at the 1978 Southern Cross Games
South American Games medalists in tennis
South American Games silver medalists for Argentina
South American Games bronze medalists for Argentina
20th-century Argentine people